Thilmeeza Hussain (born 22 March 1978) is a Maldivian civil servant and diplomat who has served as Permanent Representative of the Maldives to the United Nations and Ambassador of the Maldives to the United States and Canada since May 2019.

Hussain holds an Master of Science in Business Management from Colorado Technical University. In December, she was appointed as State Minister for Home Affairs for the North Province by President Mohamed Nasheed. In November 2009, she was appointed Deputy Permanent Representative to the United Nations, serving until March 2012.

Hussain was appointed by President Ibrahim Solih to serve as the next ambassador to the UN in 2018, succeeding Ali Naseer Mohamed. The appointment was confirmed by the Parliament of the Maldives in December. She presented her credentials as ambassador to Sean Lawler, Chief of Protocol of the Department of State, on 7 May 2019.

Between her time in public office, Hussain served as an adjunct professor at the Ramapo College of New Jersey, the co-founder of the Voice of Women (a Maldivian NGO focusing on women's empowerment, human rights and climate change), and co-chair of the Socially and Economically Just Adaptation and Mitigation Team of the U.S. Climate Action Network.

References

1978 births
Maldivian diplomats
Permanent Representatives of the Maldives to the United Nations
Living people
Ramapo College faculty